Frankie Russel Faison is an American actor known for his role as Deputy Commissioner, and, later, Commissioner, Ervin Burrell in the HBO series The Wire, as Barney Matthews in the Hannibal Lecter franchise, and as Sugar Bates in the Cinemax series Banshee.

Early life and education
Faison was born in Newport News, Virginia, the son of Carmena (née Gantt) and Edgar Faison. He studied drama at Illinois Wesleyan University in Bloomington, Illinois, where he joined Theta Chi fraternity. He went on to obtain a Master of Fine Arts degree from New York University's Tisch School of the Arts, graduating in 1974.Frankie has been married to Samantha Jupiter Faison since 2017.

Career

Faison started his acting career in 1974 in the New York Shakespeare Festival production of King Lear, with James Earl Jones in the title role. Faison later appeared opposite Jones in the Broadway premiere of Fences, for which he received a nomination for a Tony Award for Best Featured Actor in a Play. Faison's next role came in TV, in the short-lived series Hot Hero Sandwich in 1979. Faison did not make it to the big screen until 1980, when he appeared in Permanent Vacation as "Man in Lobby". A string of small roles followed until 1986, when he played the part of Lt. Fisk in Manhunter. Also that year, he appeared in the comedy The Money Pit, as an unruly construction worker, and in the Stephen King film Maximum Overdrive. In 1988, he appeared alongside Eddie Murphy and James Earl Jones in Coming to America in the role of a landlord, and won a minor role in the 1989 Spike Lee film Do the Right Thing. Faison also appeared in 1996's The Rich Man's Wife as Detective Ron Lewis. He also appeared in the 1999 remake of The Thomas Crown Affair as Detective Paretti.  Faison is notable for being the most frequent actor to appear in adaptations of Thomas Harris' Hannibal books: along with Manhunter, he also appeared as Lecter's jailer Barney in The Silence of the Lambs, the sequel Hannibal, and the prequel Red Dragon.

During the 1990–1991 season, he starred in the Fox situation comedy True Colors with Stephanie Faracy and Nancy Walker about an interracial couple. He was replaced by Cleavon Little for the second season of the program. In 1991, Faison again appeared alongside Hopkins in the film Freejack, which also starred Mick Jagger and Maximum Overdrive co-star Emilio Estevez. In 1998, he was a regular on the science-fiction TV show Prey. In 1992, he played the patriarch Bailey in the Cheryl West play Before It Hits Home.  In the 2003 film Gods and Generals, Faison played the role of Jim Lewis, a freed slave, who shares his religious faith and optimism with CSA General Thomas J. "Stonewall" Jackson as the general's personal cook. In 2004, he starred as JoJo Anderson in The Cookout and appeared in White Chicks. Faison had a starring role as the Baltimore City Police Commissioner Ervin Burrell on the HBO drama The Wire.

Faison appeared in Tyler Perry's Meet the Browns, a movie about a single mom who takes her family to Georgia for the funeral of her father—a man she never met. There, her clan is introduced to the crass, fun-loving Brown family. Faison played the role of Brown and Vera's brother, L.B. Brown. In 2009, he was in the ensemble cast of John Krasinski's adaptation of Brief Interviews With Hideous Men playing the son of a toilet attendant who caustically recounts his father's experiences in one of the titular monologues.

Faison played Richard Evans on One Life to Live from 2009 through 2012.

He appeared in episodes of Blue Bloods, which also stars Tom Selleck, as an assistant police commissioner. His main film role in this period was as Harlan in the film Adam. He also appeared in a third-season episode of Lie to Me.

Faison played the role of Sugar Bates, a prizefighter turned tavernkeeper, on the Cinemax program Banshee. He appeared as Henry "Pop" Hunter in the Netflix series Luke Cage, and played a supporting role in the 2016 Amazon Studios original special An American Girl Story – Melody 1963: Love Has to Win.

In 2017, Faison appeared in the music video for "Holding On" by The War on Drugs, from their fourth album A Deeper Understanding.

Filmography

Film

Television

References

External links

1949 births
Living people
Male actors from Virginia
American male stage actors
American male film actors
Illinois Wesleyan University alumni
People from Newport News, Virginia
African-American male actors
American male television actors
20th-century American male actors
21st-century American male actors
Tisch School of the Arts alumni